Venezuelan protests may refer to:

2007 Venezuelan protests
Venezuelan protests (2014–present)
2014 Venezuelan protests
2017 Venezuelan protests
2019 Venezuelan protests

See also
Crisis in Venezuela